Mark Mahon (born April 8, 1957) is a former Representative in the House of Representatives of the U.S. state of Florida. As of July 2015, he is the Chief Judge of Florida's 4th Circuit Court. He resides in Jacksonville, Florida.

Mahon received his bachelor's degree from the Florida State University in 1978. In addition, he received his Juris Doctor from Florida State University in 1981. In 2007, he was appointed by governor Charlie Crist as a circuit judge for the 4th Judicial Circuit of Jacksonville, Florida. This ended his term as a Representative of the 16th District of Florida.

Controversy
After becoming Interim Chief Judge of Florida's 4th Circuit Court based in Jacksonville, on July 1, 2015, Mahon issued a Summary Order prohibiting photography in public places, criticism of the court and specifically "speech that ‘degrade[s] or call[s] into question the integrity’ of judges on courthouse sidewalks" of the Duval County Courthouse, a move that was denounced by lawyers and activists as unconstitutional due to violation of the First Amendment. On July 7, Mahon altered his order to drop speech prohibitions but retain prohibitions on photography from public sidewalks. On the same day, PINAC and local activists filed federal lawsuit against Mahon's order, alleging prior restraint of free speech. On July 15, Mahon rescinded the order completely after increasing media attention and criticism.

References

External links
Official Bio for Representative Mahon

Florida State University alumni
Republican Party members of the Florida House of Representatives
Florida state court judges
Politicians from Jacksonville, Florida
1957 births
Living people